The Finke River hardyhead (Craterocephalus centralis) is a species of fish in the family Atherinidae. It is endemic to the Finke River system in the Northern Territory, where it is widespread in open water or around aquatic vegetation.  They occur in a wide range of salinity and pH and in Summer seek refuge in semi-permanent water holes.  They are omnivores and feed on  small crustaceans, insects, gastropods, polychaete worms, algae and fish eggs. This species shows a wide tolerance to temperature and salinity and is omnivore, probably spawning during warmer months. It was previously mis-identified as Craterocephalus eyresii.

References

Finke River hardyhead
Freshwater fish of the Northern Territory
Finke River hardyhead
Taxonomy articles created by Polbot